Christophe Deloire (born May 22, 1971) is a French NGO leader, author, and publisher.

He was the director of the Centre de formation des journalistes de Paris from May 2008 to July 2012, and secretary general of Reporters Without Borders since July 2012. He is also the president of the Forum on Information and Democracy since November 2019.

References

Living people
1971 births
Place of birth missing (living people)
21st-century French journalists
French investigative journalists
French documentary filmmakers
Non-profit executives